The following articles contain lists of one-hit wonders, where a one-hit wonder is any entity that achieves mainstream popularity, often for only one piece of work, and becomes known among the general public solely for that momentary success.

List of one-hit wonders in Ireland
List of one-hit wonders on the UK Albums Chart
List of one-hit wonders on the UK Singles Chart
List of one-hit wonders on the UK Official Download Chart
List of one-hit wonders in the United States